Harry Tichborne Davenport J.P. (1833 – 19 March 1895), known from 1890 as Harry Tichborne Hinckes, was a British barrister and Conservative Party politician who was elected to the House of Commons for constituencies in his native Staffordshire on two occasions in the 1880s.

Early life 
Davenport was the son of John Davenport of Westwood, Staffordshire, a Justice of the Peace and a Deputy Lieutenant of the county. He was educated at Harrow and at Christ Church, Oxford, and was called to the bar in 1860 at the Inner Temple. He later followed in his father's footsteps and became a magistrate, and in 1889 was appointed as an honorary Commissioner in lunacy.

Political career 
He first stood for Parliament at the 1874 general election in Newcastle-under-Lyme, and was unsuccessful again at a by-election in Stoke-upon-Trent in February 1875.

At the 1880 general election Davenport was elected as one of the two Members of Parliament (MPs) for the Northern division of Staffordshire. He held that seat for 5 years, until the division was abolished under the Redistribution of Seats Act 1885, when the two-member county divisions and many parliamentary boroughs were replaced with new single-member county divisions. Davenport stood in the new Leek division at the 1885 general election, where he was narrowly beaten by the Liberal Party candidate Charles Crompton.

At the 1886 election, he overturned Compton's majority and was returned to the Commons as MP for Leek. However, he did not defend his seat in 1892, when he retired from Parliament.

Personal life 
Davenport was married in 1868 to Georgiana Henrietta, the eldest daughter of Sir William Curtis, 3rd Baronet, a former High Sheriff of Shropshire. They had no children.

In 1881, his clubs were listed as the United University Club and the Carlton Club.

On 12 November 1890, near the end of his political career, he changed his surname by Royal Licence to Hinckes, to fulfil a condition in the will of Theodosia Hinckes.

He died on 19 March 1895, and his estate was bequeathed to his nephew Ralph Tichborne Davenport.

References

External links 

1833 births
1895 deaths
Conservative Party (UK) MPs for English constituencies
UK MPs 1880–1885
UK MPs 1886–1892
Politicians from Staffordshire
Members of the Inner Temple
People educated at Harrow School
Alumni of Christ Church, Oxford